Theresia Anna Maria von Brühl, Gräfin von Thun und Hohenstein (1784–1844) was a German noblewoman and pastellist.

Early life 
Born in Pförten, today the village of Brody, Żary County, von Brühl was the daughter of Aloys Friedrich Joseph Graf von Brühl (1739-1793) and his wife Josepha Christina Amalie von Schaffgotsch genannt Semperfrei von und zu Kynast und Greiffenstein (1764-1846), and therefore a niece of the patroness Tina von Brühl.

Biography 
It seems unlikely that she was working before 1800; the earliest to which any of her pieces can be ascribed is 1803. One of her pastels is a Vestal copied after a work by Angelica Kauffman that is today in the Gemäldegalerie, Dresden; another, a Sybil, bears some resemblance to a painting by Anton Rafael Mengs.

Marriage 
In 1808 she married Franz Anton, Count von Thun und Hohenstein (1786–1873), the son of Count Wenzel Joseph von Thun und Hohenstein (1737-1796) and his wife, Countess 	Maria Anna von Kolowrat-Liebsteinsky (1750-1828). They had three sons and two daughters.

References

1784 births
1844 deaths
German countesses
German women painters
19th-century German painters
19th-century German women artists
People from Żary County
Prussian nobility
Pastel artists